The Laura Ingalls Wilder House is a historic house museum at 3060 Highway A in Mansfield, Missouri. Also known as Rocky Ridge Farm, it was the home of author Laura Ingalls Wilder from 1896 until her death in 1957. The author of the Little House on the Prairie series, Wilder began writing the series while living there. The house, together with the nearby Rock Cottage on the same property, represents one of the few surviving places where she resided. Shortly after her death local residents initiated legal steps to acquire the house through the incorporation of a non-profit organization to preserve her legacy.  Owned by the Laura Ingalls Wilder Home Association, the house is open to the public for tours. It was designated a National Historic Landmark in 1991.

History
They named their home "Rocky Ridge." Two rooms of the house were initially built between 1895 and 1897. Further additions through 1912 brought the house to its present form with ten rooms. Most of the work was done by Almanzo, with help from local carpenters and from Laura, using local materials.

The house is now a museum devoted to Laura and her writings. It was placed on the National Register of Historic Places on May 19, 1970, and was designated a National Historic Landmark on July 17, 1991. The Rock Cottage, located nearby on the same property, was built by their daughter Rose Wilder Lane as a gift to her parents, who lived there from 1928 to 1936. Laura began to write at the age of 65 in there. It is part of the Wilder Museum, but is not included in the National Historic Landmark designation.

Description
The Wilder house is an irregularly-shaped wood-frame structure, typically  stories in height with a raised attic section that approaches two stories in places. The original kitchen and one other room are one story. It has several porches. Dormers and gable windows provide light and air to the upper level. There are six rooms on the main level, and three on the upper level.

Rock House

A pleasant pathway leads from the main house to the Rock House, about 1/3 miles long.  The Rock House is also accessible by a separate parking area.

See also
Ingalls House (De Smet, South Dakota)
Little House Wayside, her birth site in Wisconsin with replica of "Little House in the Big Woods"
Little House on the Prairie Museum, Independence, Kansas, with replica cabin on site of homestead

References

External links

Laura Ingalls Wilder Historic Home and Museum
The Sears Mitchell Owned by Laura Ingalls Wilder
The House on Rocky Ridge Farm: Preserved, Not Restored (William Anderson)
You Need A Farm! Laura Ingalls Wilder and American Farming (Caroline Fraser)

National Historic Landmarks in Missouri
Houses completed in 1895
Historic house museums in Missouri
Biographical museums in Missouri
Ingalls family residences
Wilder family
Museums in Wright County, Missouri
Literary museums in the United States
Women's museums in the United States
National Register of Historic Places in Wright County, Missouri
Houses on the National Register of Historic Places in Missouri
1895 establishments in Missouri